is a Japanese football player, who plays for Oita Trinita as a defender.

Career
After attending Hannan University, Kagawa was signed in 2015 by Renofa Yamaguchi.

Club statistics
Updated to 1 August 2022.

References

External links

1992 births
Living people
Hannan University alumni
Association football people from Hyōgo Prefecture
Japanese footballers
J1 League players
J2 League players
J3 League players
Renofa Yamaguchi FC players
V-Varen Nagasaki players
Tokyo Verdy players
Oita Trinita players
Association football defenders